Lac la Nonne is a lake in northern Alberta, Canada. It is located between Lac Ste. Anne County and the County of Barrhead No. 11, 85 km north-west from Edmonton, east of the Grizzly Trail.

The lake is located within the Athabasca River basin and is fed by Majeau Creek, with water levels controlled by a dam, on the outflowing MacDonald Creek which then flows into the Pembina River.

History 

Lac la Nonne is fairly large (11.8 km2) and deep (maximum depth 19.8 m) lake located about 90 km northwest of Edmonton in the counties of Barrhead and Lac Ste. Anne. This is a highly developed and popular recreational lake. The closest large population centre is the town of Barrhead, 20 km to the north. The name of the lake was originally mi-ka-sioo, meaning "eagle" in Cree. The current name, Lac la Nonne has an uncertain origin but is believed to derive from "the nun" in French. In 1827, Edward Ermatinger recorded the lake's name in his journal as Lac La Nane or “Lac La Nan“. It has been suggested that the name comes from the white-winged scoter, a duck with features similar to ducks in England known as "the nun".

The Hudson's Bay Company established a trading post at the lake in the early 19th century; by the 1830s there were many Métis, and by the 1870s a Catholic mission had been established. In the 1890s several families had settled around the lake, and by 1912 most of the available land had been homesteaded.

The Atlas of Alberta Lakes has this to say about the history of Lac LaNonne:

On the York Factory Express 

Lac la Nonne was on the York Factory Express the main overland connection between HBC headquarters at York Factory and the principal station of Columbia Department, Fort Vancouver, as recorded in the York Factory Express Journals of “1827-182S” by Edward Ermatinger's York Factory Express Journal.

Among the earliest land grants in Alberta granted at Lac la Nonne 

Only three years after the Hudson's Bay Company assumed responsibility for Ruperts Land it started surveying for issuing special land grants at Lac la Nonne:

Connection to the Klondike Trail

Camp Encounter 

Currently owned by Catholic Archdiocese of Edmonton, Camp Encounter has this to say about its history at Lac La Nonne:

Killdeer Beach Resort and Elksbeach Campground are the two commercial facilities at the lake. No commercial fisheries exist on the lake, although sport fishery, with the main catches being walleye and northern pike, is very popular in the summer. Killdeer Beach was established in 1928, making it one of Alberta's oldest such resorts. "In 1928 a local recreation centre was founded called Killdeer Beach Resort on the southwest shore."

The following quote is taken from GeoTourism Canada's more extensive history and descriptive page on Lac La None:

Land acquisition around this lake and cottage development on the shoreline increased through to the 1970s until most of the shoreline became privately owned. Many cottages have been winterized and general lake use has intensified over the last half of the 20th century. Due to concerns about the quality of the lake, further development around the lake was halted through regulations enforced by Alberta Environment."

Sammy Majeau was the first Metis President at the Lac la Nonne Local.

References

External links 
 Klondike and Assiniboine Trails
 GeotourismCanada Lac La Nonne
 Atlas of Alberta Lakes Lac La Nonne
 Trails northwest: a history of the district of Barrhead Alberta, 1867-1967 
 Lac La Nonne State of the Watershed Report 2006

County of Barrhead No. 11
Lakes of Alberta
Lac Ste. Anne County